Peltoschema is a genus of beetles in the family Chrysomelidae, insects also called leaf beetles. This genus contains about 94 species. Some mimic ladybird beetles and others are pests and can cause serious defoliation of their host plants.  Peltoschema orphana  (the fireblight beetle) can defoliate and kill populations of silver wattle. and badly damage Acacia mearnsii.  Peltoschema suturalis is native to Australia and another pest of Acacias.

Taxonomy

The genus was first described by Edmund Reitter in 1880, with the type species being Peltoschema filicornis, by monotypy, and was redescribed in 2001 by Reid and Slipinski. The taxonomic decision for the synonymy of Acacicola , Pyrgoides, and Pyrgo is based on Reid and Slipinski's 2001 paper.

 Distribution 
Beetles of this genus are found in all states and territories of Australia.

 Host plants 
Host plants include not only plants in the genera Acacia and Daviesia in the Fabaceae family, but also plants in the Myrtaceae and Apocynaceae families.

 Further reading 

 
 

Species

 Peltoschema amabilis 
 Peltoschema anxia 
 Peltoschema apicata Peltoschema arethusa Peltoschema basicollis Peltoschema brevifrons Peltoschema bunyamontis Peltoschema calomeloides Peltoschema caloptera Peltoschema carbonata Peltoschema cardinalis Peltoschema clio Peltoschema cooki Peltoschema daphne Peltoschema delicatula Peltoschema depressa Peltoschema didyma   Peltoschema dimidiata Peltoschema discoidalis Peltoschema dryope Peltoschema erythrocephala Peltoschema excisipennis Peltoschema eyrensis Peltoschema festiva  Peltoschema filicornis Peltoschema flavoinclusa   Peltoschema fuscitarsis Peltoschema haematosticta Peltoschema hamadryas Peltoschema hera Peltoschema immaculicollis Peltoschema infirma Peltoschema irene  Peltoschema isolata Peltoschema jucunda Peltoschema lepida  Peltoschema livida Peltoschema longula Peltoschema lucidula Peltoschema lucina  Peltoschema macrosticta  Peltoschema maculiventris Peltoschema mansueta   Peltoschema medea Peltoschema medioflava Peltoschema mediorufa Peltoschema mediovittata Peltoschema mitis Peltoschema mjoebergi  Peltoschema modesta Peltoschema navicula  Peltoschema nigritula  Peltoschema nigroconspersa Peltoschema nigropicta Peltoschema niobe Peltoschema notata Peltoschema obtusata Peltoschema oceanica Peltoschema oenone Peltoschema orphana Peltoschema pallidula Peltoschema pandora Peltoschema partita Peltoschema perplexa Peltoschema platycephala Peltoschema posticalis Peltoschema prosternalis Peltoschema pulchella Peltoschema quadrizonata Peltoschema rostralis Peltoschema rubiginosa Peltoschema rufopicta Peltoschema scaphula Peltoschema scutellata Peltoschema scutifera Peltoschema spectabilis Peltoschema stillatipennis Peltoschema subaenescens Peltoschema subapicalis Peltoschema substriata  Peltoschema suturalis Peltoschema suturella Peltoschema tarsalis Peltoschema tetraspilota  Peltoschema tricosa Peltoschema trilineata  Peltoschema turbata Peltoschema venusta Peltoschema venustula Peltoschema verticalis Peltoschema vesta  Peltoschema vicina  Peltoschema virens  Peltoschema viridula  Peltoschema ziczac''

References

External links
Atlas of Living Australia: Peltoschema occurrence data

Beetles of Australia
Chrysomelidae genera
Chrysomelinae
Taxa named by Edmund Reitter